Study of a River is a 1997 experimental film directed by Peter Hutton.

The experimental film focuses on the first part of a winter seasonal study of the Hudson River.

It won "Most Overlooked Short Film Award" at the 1997 Oberhausen International Short Film Festival.

In 2010, It was selected for preservation in the National Film Registry by the Library of Congress as being "culturally, historically, or aesthetically significant".

See also
 1997 in film

References

External links
Study of a River essay  by Claudia Costa Pederson at National Film Registry

Study of a River essay by Daniel Eagan In America's Film Legacy, 2009-2010: A Viewer's Guide To The 50 Landmark Movies Added To The National Film Registry In 2009-10, Bloomsbury Publishing US-A, 2011,  pages 193-196 

1997 films
United States National Film Registry films
American avant-garde and experimental films
American black-and-white films
1990s avant-garde and experimental films
1990s American films